The 3rd Guards Infantry Division (3. Garde-Infanterie-Division) was a unit of the German Army, in World War I. The division was formed on the mobilization of the German Army in August 1914 as part of the Guards Reserve Corps. The division was disbanded in 1919, during the demobilization of the German Army after World War I. It was a division of the Prussian Guards and was thus raised and recruited throughout the Kingdom of Prussia from the elite of recruits.

Combat chronicle

The 3rd Guards Infantry Division began the war on the Western Front, participating in the capture of Namur. It was transferred to the Eastern Front in September 1914, and saw action on arrival in the First Battle of the Masurian Lakes. It then fought in the Battle of Łódź. It continued fighting in the Carpathians and Galicia and then participated in the Gorlice-Tarnów Offensive. The division returned to the Western Front in April 1916 and entered the trenches in the Champagne region. In July 1916, it fought in the Battle of the Somme. At the beginning of September 1916, the division was again sent to the Eastern Front, returning in November. In 1917, it participated in the Battle of Arras and the Battle of Passchendaele. It then fought against the Allied tank attack in November 1917 in the Battle of Cambrai. In 1918, it fought in the German spring offensive. During the subsequent Allied offensives and counteroffensives, the division faced the French and Americans at Aisne-Marne and in the Meuse-Argonne Offensive. The division was rated as one of the best German divisions by Allied intelligence.

Order of battle on mobilization

The order of battle of the 3rd Guards Infantry Division on mobilization was as follows:

 5th Guards Infantry Brigade
5th Guard Regiment of Foot
5th Guard Grenadier Regiment
 6th Guards Infantry Brigade (German Empire)|6th Guards Infantry Brigade
Guard Fusilier Regiment
Lehr Infantry Regiment
 3rd Guard Field Artillery Brigade (German Empire)|3rd Guard Field Artillery Brigade
5th Guard Field Artillery Regiment
6th Guard Field Artillery Regiment
 Guards Reserve Uhlan Regiment
 1st Company/28th (2nd Brandenburg) Pioneer-Battalion

Order of battle on July 1, 1916

The 3rd Guards Infantry Division was triangularized in May 1915. The order of battle on July 1, 1916, was as follows:

 6th Guards Infantry Brigade
Guard Fusilier Regiment
Lehr Infantry Regiment
9th Colberg (Graf Gneisenau) (2nd Pomeranian) Grenadier Regiment
 Guards Reserve Uhlan Regiment
 5th Guard Field Artillery Regiment
 II Battalion/6th Reserve Foot Artillery
 1st Company/28th (2nd Brandenburg) Pioneer-Battalion
 Pioneer-Company No. 274
 Guards Minenwerfer Company No. 3

Order of battle on March 20, 1918

The 3rd Guards Infantry Division's order of battle on March 20, 1918, was as follows:

 6th Guards Infantry Brigade
Guard Fusilier Regiment
Lehr Infantry Regiment
9th Colberg (Graf Gneisenau) (2nd Pomeranian) Grenadier Regiment
Maschinengewehr-Scharfschützen-Abteilung Nr. 2
 1.Eskadron/2.Garde-Dragoner-Regiment Kaiserin Alexandra von Rußland
3rd Guard Artillery Command
5th Guard Field Artillery Regiment
1st Battalion, 2nd Guard Foot Artillery Regiment
 Staff, 104th Pioneer Battalion
1st Company, 28th (2nd Brandenburg) Pioneer Battalion
274th Pioneer Company
3rd Guard Minenwerfer Company 
 3rd Guards Division Signal command

References
 3. Garde-Infanterie-Division (Chronik 1914/1918) - Der erste Weltkrieg
 Hermann Cron et al., Ruhmeshalle unserer alten Armee (Berlin, 1935)
 Hermann Cron, Geschichte des deutschen Heeres im Weltkriege 1914-1918 (Berlin, 1937)
 Günter Wegner, Stellenbesetzung der deutschen Heere 1815-1939. (Biblio Verlag, Osnabrück, 1993), Bd. 1
 Histories of Two Hundred and Fifty-One Divisions of the German Army which Participated in the War (1914-1918), compiled from records of Intelligence section of the General Staff, American Expeditionary Forces, at General Headquarters, Chaumont, France 1919 (1920)

Notes

Infantry divisions of Germany in World War I
Military units and formations established in 1914
Military units and formations disestablished in 1919
1914 establishments in Germany